Splendrillia hayesi is a species of sea snail, a marine gastropod mollusk in the family Drilliidae.

Description

Distribution
This marine species occurs in the demersal zone off Algoa Bay, South Africa.

References

  Tucker, J.K. 2004 Catalog of recent and fossil turrids (Mollusca: Gastropoda). Zootaxa 682:1–1295.

Endemic fauna of South Africa
hayesi
Gastropods described in 1988